Cozette de Charmoy (born the 3rd of August 1939 in London, England) is a British-Canadian artist and poet.

Her artwork is included in the collections of the National Gallery of Canada, the Museu d'Art Contemporani de Barcelona, the National Museum of Women in the Arts, and the Cape Breton University Art Gallery.

In 1972, she co-founded, along with her husband Rodney de Charmoy Grey, the publishing house Éditions Ottezec.

References

20th-century Canadian women artists
21st-century Canadian women artists
1939 births
Living people
20th-century Canadian artists
21st-century Canadian artists
Artists from London